The Men's 5000 metres at the 1972 Summer Olympics in Munich, West Germany took place on 7 and 10 September 1972.

Having won the 10,000 metres a week earlier, Lasse Virén controlled the pace through the first 2000 metres in 5:32.61.  David Bedford, tired of the slow pace, passing Viren and leading a crowd to go around to a faster pace.  As the pace accelerated, Javier Álvarez came from the rear around the field to take the point for the next kilometre.  At 3200 metres, Nikolay Sviridov challenged for the lead.

Steve Prefontaine took the lead at 3400 metres. Over the next lap, Viren came from sixth place in line to mark Prefontaine.  Viren was in turn marked by Emiel Puttemans. A five-man breakaway formed.  With 850 metres to go, Viren passed Prefontaine.  Down the back stretch, Prefontaine strained back into the lead.  50 metres before the bell, Viren took the lead again, with Mohammed Gammoudi breaking off the remaining group to mark the leaders.  

Down the final backstretch, Gammoudi eased around Viren while Prefontaine hit almost a full sprint to get on Gammoudi's shoulder.  With 200 to go, Prefontaine relaxed and Viren moved ahead of him.  Prefontaine surged again to keep pace.  In the middle of the final turn, Virén changed gears into his full sprint, taking the lead.  Gammoudi couldn't keep pace and began to watch Prefontaine while trying to hold on to the silver medal.  Mid-straightaway all three checked the position of their rivals as Prefontaine took one more surge after Gammoudi.  As it was quickly clear he couldn't make enough progress, Prefontaine strained.  Ian Stewart came from the chasing group in full sprint gaining rapidly.  As Stewart caught him from behind, Prefontaine fell apart, struggling the final steps.

Virén successfully defended both titles in 1976.

Results

Heats
Qualification rule: First 2 in each heat (Q) and the next 4 fastest (q) advance to the Final.

Final

Sources

References

External links
 

 1
5000 metres at the Olympics
Men's events at the 1972 Summer Olympics